Marcel Bertrand (1899–1943) was a French footballer. He played in five matches for the France national football team in 1929.

References

External links
 

1899 births
1943 deaths
French footballers
France international footballers
Place of birth missing
Association football defenders
FC Sète 34 players
Club Français players
Olympic footballers of France
Footballers at the 1928 Summer Olympics